Peter Wunstorf (born July 15, 1959) is a Canadian cinematographer from Edmonton, Alberta. He is most noted for his work on the 1994 film Double Happiness, for which he was a Genie Award nominee for Best Cinematography at the 15th Genie Awards in 1994.

Filmography

Film

Television

References

External links

1959 births
Living people
Canadian cinematographers
People from Edmonton